The Atlanta Law School was a private, night law school for working professionals and others seeking a legal education. The school's faculty members were practicing lawyers and judges from across the state of Georgia.

History
The school began in 1890 and closed its doors in 1994. It was accredited by the Georgia Board of Bar Examiners. Today the school continues as a scholarship fund for those students who would not otherwise have the opportunity to practice law.
In 1890, Hamilton Douglas, Sr., Hooper Alexander, Archibald H. Davis and Charles A. Read, began night law classes for those who were unable to attend law classes during the day. The law school has graduated over 6,000 in its 104 years of operation. It was incorporated under the laws of the State of Georgia in 1892. The law school conferred the Bachelor of Laws degree and students had diploma privileges along with the University of Georgia and Mercer University. Later the school adopted the Juris Doctor degree as the requirements of admission to the bar included college credits and finally a college degree. Students could return for an advanced degree, the Master of Laws, in litigation. National Legal Fraternity Delta Theta Phi had an active senate at the school. The Wayne Senate was named for Judge James Moore Wayne of Savannah, Georgia, who served as an associate justice of the Supreme Court of the United States from 1835 until his death in 1867. The Senate was installed at Atlanta Law School in 1914 by Robert S. Parker, late Governor of the Federal Reserve Bank of Atlanta Georgia.  The Dean of the Wayne Senate in 1988 was James Fabian Bernecker.  The School offered the Valedictorian Prize, Harrison Company Prize and The Hershel E. Cole League of Honor Graduates. From its founding, the instructors were always engaged in the practice of law, either as practitioners or as judges (sitting or retired). No professional teachers or instructors were engaged in the teaching process throughout the school's history.  The character of the school was defined as a "Lawyer's Law School".

Deans of the law school
The late Hamilton Douglas, Sr., served as dean of the law school. His son Hamilton Douglas, Jr. continued the school until Herschel E Cole became the last dean of the school. Donald W. Gettle served as assistant dean for the last thirty years of the school's existence. Robert E. Cochran, II was named an assistant dean in 1985. Board of trustees included Herschel E. Cole, chairman, Charles W. Allen, Donald W. Gettle, E. Lewis Hansen (1985)
Dean Virlin Moore and Dean Wayne C. Pressley were also quite involved throughout the transition of Woodrow Wilson College of Law.

Events leading to closing
In 1998 the State Bar of Georgia modified the requirements for bar admission, allowing only ABA-accredited law school graduates to take the bar exam. This rule change affected the three night law schools in Georgia. Atlanta Law School trustees decided to close the school. The Woodrow Wilson College of Law (founded in 1933) attempted to merge with Georgia State University but was unsuccessful. John Marshall Law School (founded in 1933) was able to meet the requirements of the ABA and continues to this day.

Notable alumni
Members of the Georgia judiciary, state legislature, and business owners received their legal training at the school. Atlanta's first female lawyer, Minnie Hale Daniel was a graduate of Atlanta Law School in 1911. Helen Douglas Mankin who would later become Georgia's first woman member of Congress received her LL.B. from Atlanta Law School in 1920. Judge Juanita Marsh attended in the 1940s–50s. Other alumni include former New York City Councilman and Congressional nominee Domenic Recchia, Atlanta trial attorney Don Keenan, former Georgia State Representative Chesley V. Morton, Georgia Supreme Court Justices John E. Frankum, and Charles S. Reid, and U.S. District Court Judge Frank A. Hooper, Jr. (who also taught at the school).

Alumni includes a late Governor of the Federal Reserve Bank System, a former Judge Advocate General of the U.S. Army, a former United States Attorney, Two former Members of Congress, a former City Attorney for the City of Atlanta, Judges of the Superior Court, County, and Municipal Courts. Six Governors, two Chief Justices of the Supreme Court of Georgia and two former Mayors of the City of Atlanta received degrees from Atlanta Law School.

White supremacist lawyer and convicted bomber J. B. Stoner received a law degree from the school in 1952. He went on to defend James Earl Ray and men accused of bombing the home 6-year-old Donal Godfrey.

References

Law schools in Georgia (U.S. state)
Independent law schools in the United States
Universities and colleges in Atlanta
Defunct private universities and colleges in Georgia (U.S. state)
Defunct law schools